is a mountain of the Yūbari Mountains on the border of Minamifurano, Yūbari, Hokkaidō, Japan. It is the source of the Yūbari River.

References
 Geographical Survey Institute

Mountains of Hokkaido